Bénichou is a surname. Notable people with the surname include:

Berthe Bénichou-Aboulker (1888–1942), French Algerian poet and playwright
Fabrice Benichou (born 1966), French boxer
Maurice Bénichou (1943–2019), French actor
Paul Bénichou (1908–2001), French author
Pierre Bénichou (born 1938), French journalist

Maghrebi Jewish surnames
Surnames of Algerian origin